2007 the World Tour is the third live album by Taiwanese singer Jay Chou, released on 31 January 2008 by Sony Music Taiwan and JVR Music and included a date filmed at Banqiao Stadium on 10 November 2007 from the 2007 World Tour.

Track listing
 "Golden Armor" (黃金甲) – 3:17
 "Incomparable" (無雙) – 5:06
 "A Secret That Can't Be Told" (不能說的秘密) – 4:57
 "A Step Back" (退後) – 4:24
 "Sweet" (甜甜的) – 4:11
 "The Longest Movie" (最長的電影) – 4:01
 "A Dandelion's Promise" (蒲公英的約定) – 4:13
 "White Windmill" (白色風車) – 4:38
 "Chrysanthemum Terrace" (菊花台) – 5:02
 "Malt Sugar" (麥芽糖) – 4:23
 "Cowboy is Very Busy" (牛仔很忙) – 2:45
 "Listen to Mom" (聽媽媽的話) – 3:25
 "Herbalist Manual" (本草綱目) feat. Alan Ko – 3:30
 "A Thousand Miles Away" (千里之外) feat. Fei Yu–ching – 4:17
 "Nocturne" (夜曲) – 3:43
 "Rosemary" (迷迭香) – 4:12
 "Sunshine Homeboy" (陽光宅男) – 5:54
 "Hair Like Snow" (發如雪) – 6:06
 "Fearless" (霍元甲) – 3:18
 "Nunchucks" (雙截棍) – 3:04
 "Master Chou" (周大俠) feat. Funky Tu – 2:15

References

External links
  Jay Chou discography@JVR Music

2007 live albums
Jay Chou albums
Sony Music Taiwan albums